Sidney Ernest Plunkett (2 October 1920 – 26 June 1986) was an English footballer who played as a right winger.

Career
Plunkett began his career with Norwich-based clubs Esdelle Works and Norwich YMCA. In 1938, Plunkett signed for Norwich City, making three league appearances, before joining Wolverhampton Wanderers in April 1939. As a result of World War II, Plunkett failed to make an appearance for Wolves, moving back to Norwich in 1939, where he made a further 28 Football League appearances, scoring seven times. Plunkett subsequently dropped into Non-League football, playing for Chelmsford City, Great Yarmouth Town and Gorleston.

References

1920 births
1986 deaths
Association football midfielders
English footballers
Footballers from Norwich
Norwich City F.C. players
Wolverhampton Wanderers F.C. players
Chelmsford City F.C. players
Great Yarmouth Town F.C. players
Gorleston F.C. players
English Football League players